The Shift is a short film directed by David Trumble, starring Greg Lock and Graham Hornsby. The film, written by David Trumble, Matt Brothers, and Greg Lock, focuses on a paramedic and Emergency Medical Technician (EMT) working for the London Ambulance Service on a night shift.

Plot
The protagonist Damon Yorke, played by Greg Lock is a young but highly valued and experienced London based paramedic. Damon is having some relationship problems with his girlfriend Clare and is being forced to attend couples counseling. Damon is advised to try phoning Clare just before she goes to bed, whilst he is on shift work, just to reassure her that he is okay and that he loves her. However, on the first night shift when he wants to try this new system he accidentally leaves his phone at home.

His crewmate, EMT Joe Greene (played by Graham Hornsby), claims to have left his phone back at the ambulance station. So, Damon begins a personal quest to try to find a phone so he can call Clare. The only problem is, Damon is confronted by the many incidents any ambulance would encounter on a night shift, ranging from the trivial to the serious, and these keep getting in his way. Consequently, Damon's anger and frustrations with his personal life come to the surface, and something's got to give.

Cast

 Greg Lock as Damon Yorke
 Graham Hornsby as Joe Greene
 Debbie Wicks as Clare
 Liam H. Dempsey as Security Guard
 Victoria Eldon as Sister
 Charlotte Eldon as Electrocuted Girl
 Tommy Egerton as Old Lady
 Kathryn Ritchie as Emma
 Eifion Robert Melnyk-Jones as Llewelyn

Production

The film was shot over the course of five nights, with an ambulance hired for two of them. The majority of the filming took place in Bournemouth, England. Even though the film takes place in London, only Damon's flat and the riverside (with Canary Wharf in the background) were the only actual locations actually filmed in London.

Adam Scarth, Director of Photography, shot the film on a Canon 7D, assisted by Noorganah Robertson and Thomas Saville.

Charity gala premiere
The Shift was first shown as part of a charity screening of David Williams' mockumentary Beyond the Pole (2010), at The Phoenix Picture House in Oxford, on 15 April 2010. The screening was organised by the Oxford Community Foundation to raise money for the charity. Both the director (Williams) and star (Helen Baxendale) of Beyond the Pole attended the event. The Shift was shown as the first part of the evening.

References

External links
 

British short films
2010 films
2010s English-language films